Ray Lawrence (born Ray Skreprich; August 19, 1927) is a former bandleader, record company executive, record producer and personal manager.

Biography
Lawrence's father was born in Wickhaven, Pennsylvania and his mother was born in Uzhorod, Bohemia. Ray's grandfather died in the Darr Mine Disaster of 1907 in Wickhaven. After the disaster Ray's grandmother moved her children back to Uzhorod. While in Uzhorod and during World War I, Lawrence's father, although he was a United States citizen, was drafted at the age of 16 into the Austrian Army. He served as a runner in the trenches. After his service he met his wife in Uzhorod, married and moved to Lorain, Ohio, an industrial city 30 miles west of Cleveland, Ohio on the shore of Lake Erie settled by many Eastern European immigrants. Two of the largest employers in Lorain during the early to mid 1900s were the American Ship Building Company and U.S. Steel.

Lawrence was born the middle of three children in Lorain, Ohio. He was in elementary school during the Great Depression. When he was 8 or 9 years old he worked at the carnival, carrying water. During summer vacations to visit his cousin's in Lyndora, Pennsylvania, he'd play together with Andy Warhol. While in high school on weekends and during the summer Ray worked in the fields picking beans and strawberries, washing cars, delivering women's clothing and at the Lorain Works of U.S. Steel, a large steel mill on the shore of Lake Erie, as a laborer, burner and clerk. He would listen to his favorite big bands on the radio, from records and by attending live performances at the many ballrooms (including the Cedar Point Grand Ballroom, Crystal Beach Ballroom and others) that lined the Lake Erie shoreline.

On his 17th birthday, before finishing high school, and after his brother told him to do so, Lawrence enlisted in the United States Navy. This was towards the end of World War II. He wanted to be a dive bomber gunner, but because of dental problems he wasn't offered that choice. He served in the Pacific Theatre on the escort aircraft carrier USS Point Cruz (CVE-119). The USS Point Cruz hosted a Marine Corps air squadron. He was on the crew that commissioned the ship and was a plank owner. He served as a 20 mm anti-aircraft gun gunner, 40 mm anti-aircraft gun trainer and storekeeper. Because of his background he was simply known as "Russian" on the ship. During his service the ship had missions to Guam, the Marshall Islands, Okinawa, Iwo Jima, Tokyo and other locations. The ship transported some survivors from the dive bomber attack on the USS Franklin (CV-13), was at Buckner Bay in Okinawa during Typhoon Louise in 1945 and at Bikini Atoll during preparations for the atomic bomb testing of Operation Crossroads in 1946. While in the Navy Ray was paid $21 per month. After serving in the Navy 2 years he returned to Lorain and finished high school. Lawrence was originally a member of his high school class of 1945, but because of his enlistment, graduated as a member of his high school class of 1947. On his return to Lorain, he did not become a member of the 5220 "club" (52 weeks of work for $20 per week) but instead he worked checking train cars for the terminal railroad at U.S. Steel. He then went to Ohio University in Athens, Ohio.

In 1948 while at Ohio University he started his own big band consisting of 3 saxophones, 1 trumpet, 1 trombone and 3 rhythm players. He was a drummer. He was born Ray Skrepich, but when it came time to name his band he thought his name was too hard to remember and pronounce, so his father suggested he use his mother's maiden name of Lawrence. As a result, the band was named "Ray Lawrence and his Orchestra". After a couple of years his big band disbanded and he formed a rhythm and blues quartet named "Rockin Ray and his Rocket Rhythm". His quartet played race music on the Chitlin' Circuit and shared the bill with groups such as Bo Diddley, Fats Domino and Otis Williams and the Charms.

In the spring of 1953 Lawrence stopped performing and was a salesman for American Tobacco Company, Johnson Wax and then a reporter for F. W. Dodge Corporation. He then started his own theatrical booking agency in Cleveland, Ohio named Artistry and Promotion. He booked musical combos and some variety acts across the United States and Canada. He was married in February 1954, and subsequently he and his wife Grace had three children, Jeff, Connie and Lisa. He also has four grandchildren, Christopher, Kathy, Matthew and Jenna.

In the fall of 1960 Lawrence joined Cosnat Distributing, a record distributor, in Cleveland, Ohio as a salesman. Jerry Blaine founded Cosnat and it was a “leader in its field on the Eastern Seaboard “. In the fall of 1961 he moved to Los Angeles, California and was instrumental in setting up Cosnat's West Coast operations as a salesman and then branch manager.

In the fall of 1962 Lawrence became the general sales manager for Colpix Records and Dimension Records, which were divisions of Columbia Pictures, in New York, New York. After a year, he was promoted to General Manager of Colpix Records and worked directly for Don Kirshner after Kirshner sold Aldon Music to Columbia Pictures in 1963 and became head of Columbia's newly expanded record division. While at Colpix Records Ray signed and produced Woody Allen’s first comedy album and also signed John Davidson and Davy Jones before he became a member of “The Monkees”.

In April 1965 Lawrence started his own business, Ray Lawrence, Ltd. to specialize in promoting phonograph records and servicing rack jobbers, one stops and retail record outlets. His first client was Madman Muntz and some of his other clients included Johnny Mathis, Robert Goulet, Bill Cosby, [Farley Parkenfarker], [Okie Duke], Woody Allen, Barbra Streisand, Chet Atkins, Jerry Reed, Floyd Cramer, Three Dog Night, Steppenwolf, Ray Price, the North Texas State One O'Clock Lab Band under Leon Breeden, World's Greatest Jazz Band and others. He was known in the record business for his moniker, "The Record Man".

In the late 1970s he started Dobre Records, a jazz record label. He produced and released over 50 albums of jazz musicians including Milcho Leviev, Cannonball Adderley, Ruth Brown and others. A detailed discography is available below. Most of the records were recorded at Gold Star Studios in Hollywood, California. Five of the albums he produced were nominated for Grammy awards. Lawrence was also involved in starting at least two other record labels, including Black Jazz Records and Jazzz Records.

In 1979 Lawrence attended the 11th Annual Cultural Awards dinner at the White House hosted by President Jimmy Carter.

In May 1980, because of changes in the record industry business model Lawrence stopped promoting phonograph records and started acting as a personal manager for musical artists, variety acts and others. Some of his clients included Trini Lopez, Al Martino and Buzz Aldrin.

Lawrence died on August 27, 2017, in Studio City, California.

Discography
Some albums that Ray has produced.

Notes and references

Further reading
"Ray Lawrence: The Record Man". As told to Allen Secher. Bohas Books, 2017. 

1927 births
Living people
People from Lorain, Ohio
Record producers from Ohio
Jazz record producers
United States Navy personnel of World War II
United States Navy sailors